"Up and Gone" is a song recorded by American country music trio Jennifer McCarter and The McCarters. It was released in March 1989 as the first single from their album Better Be Home Soon. The song peaked at number 9 on the Billboard Hot Country Singles chart.  The song was written by Verlon Thompson and Bill Caswell.

Chart performance

Year-end charts

References

1989 singles
The McCarters songs
Warner Records singles
Song recordings produced by Paul Worley
Songs written by Bill Caswell
Songs written by Verlon Thompson
1989 songs